Splash About International Limited, usually referred to as Splash About, is best known as a designer, manufacturer and retailer of swimwear and swimming aids for children and babies, however the company also designs and makes maternity swimsuits. It operates from the United Kingdom.

History 
Splash About was founded by Desri and Robin Goodwin in 2001 with their first creations, a float jacket and a float suit.

The company is best known for developing the Happy Nappy system (in Britain, a nappy is a diaper), which comprises waterproof neoprene outer layers with leak-restricting grip and an inner absorbent layer. The idea is to allow babies to swim without contaminating the pool.

In 2011, Warrington-based private equity firm Energize Capital acquired a majority stake in the company.

Work with the ASA and BSI 
In 2014 Splash About announced that it was working alongside the Amateur Swimming Association and Water Babies to create a new British Standard for baby and Toddler Swimming.

In September 2015, the company was one of the sponsors of the BSI Group's Publicly Available Specification "Safeguarding 0 to 4 year old children within the teaching of swimming, including any associated professional photography. Code of practice" (PAS 520:2015), which aims "to tackle codifying best practice in how very young children should be taught to swim and professionally photographed during lessons."

Media 
In 2015 US singer Beyoncé released a vacation video on Instagram in which her daughter Blue Ivy was wearing one of Splash About's float suits.

External links

References

Baby products
Diaper brands
Clothing companies established in 2001
Online retailers of the United Kingdom
Retail companies established in 2001
Sporting goods brands
Sportswear brands
Sporting goods manufacturers of the United Kingdom
Swimwear brands
Swimwear manufacturers
Clothing brands of the United Kingdom